François Fouché (born 5 June 1963) is a South African athlete. He competed in the men's long jump at the 1996 Summer Olympics, jumping 7.44m to finish 38th during the qualifying round.

References

1963 births
Living people
Athletes (track and field) at the 1996 Summer Olympics
South African male long jumpers
Olympic athletes of South Africa
Athletes (track and field) at the 1994 Commonwealth Games
Commonwealth Games competitors for South Africa
World Athletics Championships athletes for South Africa
Place of birth missing (living people)
20th-century South African people
21st-century South African people